Clara Veseliza, known professionally as Clair Marlo, is a Croatian-American record producer, songwriter, composer, educator, and performer.

She is known for her multiplatinum hit singles "'Til They Take My Heart Away" and "Without Me", both from her debut album, Let It Go. Her songs became a staple in radio stations during the early 1990s and her albums (both as recording artist and as producer) for Sheffield Lab Records have become audiophile staples and collectors items around the world.  Marlo is also known for singing "Sviraj" and "Lullaby" on Paul Schwartz's album, Aria 2 - New Horizon, which reached number 5 on Billboards Top Classical Crossover Chart in 1999.

Career
Clair Marlo was born in New York and grew up in Astoria and Flushing, Queens. She began her musical studies at the age of five with accordion, then started piano and voice at the age of nine. She had her first song published by Leeds Levy (MCA Music) at the age of 16, when she started college for composition at the Aaron Copeland School of Music at Queens College. She studied opera with opera singer Camilla Williams. Her private teachers also included Spud Murphy, and John Motley. Clair holds a Bachelors Degree from Berklee College of Music (1980) in Composition with additional courses in Audio Production and Engineering.

She owns the music production company Invisible Hand Productions, founded in 1995, and production companies Sotto-Voce (with Wendell Yuponce) and Building 11. Clair also owns publishing companies, Tarzana Jane and Veselica Music. 

Marlo has worked with many notable artists, composers, musicians, engineers and producers.  Notable people Clair has worked with include Jeff Porcaro, Steve Porcaro, Joe Porcaro, David Paich, Leland Sklar, Grant Geissman, Craig Fuller, Abraham Laboriel Sr., Dean Parks, Luis Conte, Steve Katz, George Massenberg and Bill Schnee.  The now late pop rock drummer, Jeff Porcaro, played on her song "'Til They Take My Heart Away" and other songs on her album, Let It Go.

Marlo has produced such artists as Harry Chapin (posthumously), Pat Coil, Michael Ruff, Kilauea (Daniel Ho), and Grant Geissman. Her production of Michael Ruff's "Speaking in Melodies" for Sheffield Lab Records is an audiophile collector's item and was on Stereophile's list of "1994 Records to Die For".

Discography
Solo albums/as featured artist
Let It Go (1989)
Til They Take My Heart Away (Finyl Edits)
Til They Take My Heart Away (1994 Power Tools Edit)
Behaviour Self (1995)
Rediscovered (2007)
Trinity (2019)

Group albums
Liquid Amber (1994)
Liquid Amber - Adrift (1995)
Tairona - Andean Christmas (1996)
Vox Mundi - Christmas Spirit (1998)

As producer
Pat Coil - Steps (1990)
Kilauea - Antigua Blue (1992)
Pat Coil - Just Ahead (1992)
Michael Ruff - Speaking in Melodies (1993)
Kilauea - Diamond Collection (1995)
Grant Geissman - In with the Out Crowd (1998)
Lori Barth - Sensuel (2002)

As composer/songwriter
Glenn Eric - Glenn Eric (1987)
Spies - Music of Espionage (1988)
Let it Go (1989)
Kilauea - Antigua Blue (1992)
Liquid Amber (1994)
Behaviour Self (1995)
Liquid Amber - Adrift (1995)
Tairona - Andean Christmas (1996)
Grant Geissman - In with the Out Crowd (1998)
Vox Mundi - Christmas Spirit (1998)
Mark Winkler - City Lights (1998)
Aria - 3 CD collection (2004)
Red Rose - Good Friends (2004)
Neil Young - Living with War (2006)
Julia Duncan - The Love Lounge (2007)
3 Hours of Creepy Sounds for Halloween(2009)
Celtic Journey - Celtic Journey (2011)
Up Close Volume 8 - Sheffield Lab Sampler Featuring Pat Coil

Personal life
Marlo is based out of Los Angeles, and Istria, Croatia.  She has a daughter and a son.

References

1959 births
Living people
American people of Croatian descent
American women pop singers
American jazz composers
Women jazz composers
Berklee College of Music alumni
American women singer-songwriters
Record producers from New York (state)
American women record producers
American keyboardists
American session musicians
American singer-songwriters
21st-century American women